Profundiconus cakobaui is a species of sea snail, a marine gastropod mollusk in the family Conidae, the cone snails and their allies.

Like all species within the genus Profundiconus, these cone snails are predatory and venomous. They are capable of "stinging" humans, therefore live ones should be handled carefully or not at all.

Description
The size of the shell varies between 19 mm and 25 mm.

Distribution
This species occurs in the Pacific Ocean off Fiji and Tonga

References

 Tucker J.K. & Tenorio M.J. (2009) Systematic classification of Recent and fossil conoidean gastropods. Hackenheim: Conchbooks. 296 pp.

External links
 The Conus Biodiversity website
 

cakobaui
Gastropods described in 2008